Aishatu Dahiru Ahmed (born 11 August 1971) also known as Binani is a Nigerian senator of the All Progressives Congress "APC" representing Adamawa Central senatorial district in the 9th Assembly She was formerly a member of the House of Representatives representing Yola North/Yola South/Girei federal constituency as a member of the People's Democratic Party in the 7th Assembly (2011–2015).

Life
She was born in 1971. She started her early school education at Kaduna and completed it at Gwadabawa Primary School, Jimeta Yola. She went to the UK for her university education where she obtained a Higher National Diploma in Electrical Engineering at the University of Southampton.
She is currently the Chairman of the Senate Committee on Sustainable Development Goals (SDGs).
She was declared winner of the APC Adamawa governorship primary after polling 430 votes to defeat her closest contestant, Nuhu Ribadu, the pioneer Executive Chairman of Nigeria’s Economic and Financial Crimes Commission (EFCC), who got 288 votes.

Political career 
In 2021 an appeal court sitting in Yola declared Aishatu Binani as the governoship candidate of the All Progressive Congress APC in Adamawa.

Bills and motions
Modibo Adama University of Technology (Establishment etc) Bill
Fiscal Responsibility Commission (Establishment etc) Bill
1999 Constitution (Alteration) Bill
National Dermatology Specialist Hospital, Garkida, Adamawa State (Establishment etc) Bill
Federal Medical Centre (Establishment etc) Bill
Modibo Adama University Yola Teaching Hospital (Establishment) Bill
Federal Medical Centre Mubi, Adamawa State (Establishment etc) Bill
University Teaching Hospital (Reconstitution Of Board) Act (Amendment) Bill
Criminal Code Act (Amendment) Bill

References

Living people
Nigerian Muslims
1971 births
Alumni of the University of Southampton
Adamawa State politicians